Typhogenes is a genus of moths of the family Yponomeutidae.

Species
Typhogenes psapharota - Meyrick, 1917 

Yponomeutidae